One Man's Journey is a three-film documentary series featuring the canoe travels of naturalist and filmmaker Robert Perkins. The series was broadcast on PBS in 2005.

The series consists of three films, titled Into the Great Solitude (1987), Talking to Angels, and The Crocodile River.

References

External links

Documentary Educational Resources page
Robert Perkins bio on DER

PBS original programming